On November 15, 2008, 12 miners died after two explosions at a mine in Petrila, one of six coal mining cities in the Jiu Valley region of Hunedoara County, Romania. On November 24 another miner died at Floreasca Hospital in Bucharest raising the death toll to 13.

Background
Two explosions in a coal mine in southwestern Romania Saturday killed eight miners and four emergency workers, officials said.

Later, a second explosion killed the four rescue workers, said Ilie Păducel, mayor of the town of Petrila where the mine is located.
Hundreds of relatives gathered at the mine after the first explosion, Realitatea TV reported. Romanian President Traian Băsescu said he would travel to the site later Saturday.

Mine officials said the explosions were believed to have been caused by an accumulation of methane gas. Officials have banned anyone from going down the mine for the next 48 hours.
Eight injured miners are being treated for burns. Officials said about 100 miners were working at the time of the first explosion.

Relates
"We don't know anything, he is down there in the mine, that's all we know, we know absolutely nothing of him," one relative said.

Another complained: "I don't know where to go, nobody tells us anything, I don't know whether I should stay here or go to the hospital."
Men stand outside the Petrila mine waiting for news.

Some 100 people were working in the mine at the time of the first blast.

Mining was once a thriving industry in Romania, employing almost half a million people, and miners were a feared political force in the 1990s.

But the industry has struggled in recent years to compete against cheaper imported coal and cleaner forms of energy.

In 2001, a Romanian mining explosion left 14 people dead.

See also
 Jiu Valley
 League of Miners Unions of the Jiu Valley

References
Chron (English)
Realitatea TV (Romanian)
Ziua (Romanian)
Gândul (Romanian)
FreeNews (Romanian)
HotNews (Romanian)

Explosions in 2008
2008 mining disasters
Coal mining disasters in Romania
2008 in Romania
2008 disasters in Romania